Tipalt Burn is a burn which lies to the east of Greenhead, Northumberland. The burn passes several historical sites such as Thirlwall Castle and discharges into the River South Tyne near the village of Haltwhistle.

See also
List of rivers of England

References

External links

Tipalt